is a private university in Miyazaki, Miyazaki, Japan. The predecessor of the school was founded in 1923, and it was chartered as a university in 1987.

External links
 Official website 

Educational institutions established in 1923
Private universities and colleges in Japan
Universities and colleges in Miyazaki Prefecture
1923 establishments in Japan